Baron Viktor Magnus von Born (8 October 1851, Helsinki - 15 September 1917) was a Finnish lawyer, farmer and politician. He was a member of the Diet of Finland from 1877 to 1878 and from 1885 to 1906 and of the Parliament of Finland from 1910 to 1913, representing the Swedish People's Party of Finland (SFP). He was the last Lord Marshal of the Diet of Finland in from 1905 to 1906. He was the father of Ernst von Born.

Gallery

References

Further reading

External links 

1851 births
1917 deaths
Politicians from Helsinki
People from Uusimaa Province (Grand Duchy of Finland)
Finnish people of German descent
20th-century Finnish nobility
Swedish People's Party of Finland politicians
Members of the Diet of Finland
Members of the Parliament of Finland (1910–11)
Members of the Parliament of Finland (1911–13)
University of Helsinki alumni
19th-century Finnish nobility